Umarga/ Omerga is a town with a municipal council in the Osmanabad district in the Indian state of Maharashtra. It is an administrative headquarter of the Umarga Tehsil.

Geography
The town of Umarga is situated near National highway 65 Pune-Solapur-Hyderabad-Machilipatnam. It is located 85 km by road east of the city of Solapur, 95 km by road from the district capital of Osmanabad, and 20 km west of the Karnataka-Maharashtra State boundary. The nearest towns are Jahagir Chincholi (5 km;south) Turori (8 km east west from NH65 Umarga), Diggi (17 km), Madaj (16 km by road to the southwest), and Murum (9 km by road to the east on NH-65). The town of Umarga has an elevation of 572 metres (1876 feet).

Demographics

In the 2011 census, the town of Umarga had a population of 35,609. The official language is Marathi.

Economy and infrastructure
Agriculture and agriculture related services are the main income sources for the people here. Umarga has a MIDC industrial park of 2500 hectares. Umarga is a census town. It is a developing town and it runs a weekly bazaar on Sunday. Omerga MIDC is attracting investment in textile and beverage industries.

Religious places 
 Mahadev Mandir (Shiva Temple): Umarga has a 1000-year-old ancient magnificent "Hemadpanthi" Temple of Lord Shiva. This indicates its roots linked to the Shilahar, Rastrkuta, Chalukya Dynasty.
 Birudev Temple is on Latur Road. Birudev is worshiped as the god of the Dhangar community.
Hanuman Mandir
Kala Maruti Mandir on Hyderabad road
Tulja Bhawani Temple and Renuka Mata Temple
Sayad Basha Dargah
Maheboob subhani Dargah
Shri Nath Mandir is the temple of Saint Eknath. Also has 2.5 Feet statue of Shri Vitthal. Every year there is a Festival called NATH-SHASHTHI, which includes Bhajan, Kirtan, Ann-daan.
Siddheshwar Temple Nagral:12 km south of Umarga is holy temple and is worshiped by Hindu community.
Shivrambuva Temple Wagdari:13 km north of Umarga is village deity of Wagdari and on the eve of every Mahashivratri the people of Wagdari celebrate it as Mela (Hindu festival)
 Sayyed Haji Munnawar Dargha, Gunjoti
Achalbet Devastan, Turori
Kapil Vastu Buddha Vihar, Turori
Vahya Bandenavaj, Turori
Hanuman Mandir Ekondi (J)
 Siddappa Temple Ekondi (J)
Tulja bhavani mandir Ekondi (J)
 Ambabai Temple bhagatwadi.
 Pravin baba math Ekondi

References

Cities and towns in Osmanabad district
Talukas in Maharashtra